Whampoa Makan Place is a hawker centre and wet market on blocks 90, 91 and 92 along Whampoa Drive in Whampoa, Singapore. The centre is divided into two sections, with one being the hawker centre, and the other being the wet market.

History
Formerly known as Whampoa Market and Food Centre, the hawker centre was opened 1973, replacing Rayman Market, a municipal market that serviced the former housing estate, Rayman Estate. The food cetre went under renovation in 2016, an was upgraded in 2007, being renamed as the Whampoa Makan Place. The food centre is also known for some of its stalls, such as Balestier Road Hoover Rojak, Beach Road Fish Head Bee Hoon, Huat Heng Fried Oyster and Liang Zhao Ji Duck Rice, all of which have been awarded the Michelin Bib Gourmand award. The market was included in the Balestier Heritage Trail in 2018.

On 12 February 2017, a fire broke out in the Hi Leskmi Nasi Lemak stall in the food centre. The fire was extinguished by members of the public before firefighters arrived, and no one was injured.

The food centre was temporarily closed on 22 July 2021, along with the Clementi 448 Market, as Covid-19 clusters at the food centres were linked to a Covid-19 cluster at the Jurong Port Fishery. The food centre was reopened on 6 August 2021, after deep cleaning and disinfection.

The market was named after Hoo Ah Kay, a Chinese merchant who was commonly known as Whampoa.

References

1973 establishments in Singapore
Hawker centres in Singapore